Bahram Tavakoli may refer to:

 Bahram Tavakoli (water polo) (born 1953), Iranian water polo player
 Bahram Tavakoli (film director) (born 1976), Iranian film director and screenwriter